Colasposoma laticorne is a species of leaf beetle of West Africa and the Democratic Republic of the Congo. It was first described from Gabon by James Thomson in 1858.

References

laticorne
Beetles of the Democratic Republic of the Congo
Insects of West Africa
Taxa named by James Thomson
Beetles described in 1858